Saša Magazinović (born 1 November 1978) is a Bosnian politician who is a member of the House of Representatives. He has been a member of the Social Democratic Party since 1997.

Magazinović was born in Sarajevo in 1978 and has a graduation from the University of Sarajevo. Since 2010, he has been a member of the national House of Representatives, previously serving as a member of the Federal House of Peoples.

Early life and education
Magazinović was born on 1 November 1978 in Sarajevo, SFR Yugoslavia, present-day Bosnia and Herzegovina. He graduated from the University of Sarajevo in 2010.

Career
Magazinović has been a member of the Social Democratic Party (SDP BiH) since 1997. He was a member of the SDP BiH's presidency from 2009 to 2015. He was a councilor in the Municipal Council of Ilidža on two occasions. Magazinović was elected to the Sarajevo Cantonal Assembly following the 2006 general election. At the same time, he was a member of the Federal House of Peoples.

At the 2010 general election, Magazinović was elected to the national House of Representatives. He was re-elected to office at the 2014 and 2018 general election.

On 2 December 2020, Magazinović resigned as chairman of the SDP BiH's main board, due to alleged information that some members of the SDP BiH in the town of Srebrenica misused Bosniak documents in favor of Srebrenica mayor Mladen Grujičić during the 2020 municipal elections.

Magazinović was once again re-elected as member of the national House of Representatives at the 2022 general election, obtaining over 13,000 votes.

Personal life
Saša is married to Anamarija Magazinović, and together they have two children. They live in Sarajevo.

Health
In November 2019, Magazinović underwent surgery after he was diagnosed with skin cancer. In December 2019, after his second surgery, Magazinović informed the public that "everything is clean and that there are no cancer cells left."

References

External links

Saša Magazinović at parlament.ba

1978 births
Living people
Politicians from Sarajevo
Serbs of Bosnia and Herzegovina
Academic staff of the University of Sarajevo
Bosnia and Herzegovina politicians
Social Democratic Party of Bosnia and Herzegovina politicians
Members of the House of Representatives (Bosnia and Herzegovina)